|}

The Prix Guillaume d'Ornano is a Group 2 flat horse race in France open to three-year-old thoroughbreds. It is run at Deauville over a distance of 2,000 metres (about 1¼ miles), and it is scheduled to take place each year in August.

History
The event was established in 1952, and it was originally called the Prix de la Côte Normande. The inaugural running was contested over 3,000 metres, and the race was shortened to 2,000 metres in its second year. It was extended to 2,400 metres in 1958, and restored to 2,000 metres in 1960.

The present system of race grading was introduced in 1971, and for a period the Prix de la Côte Normande was classed at Group 3 level. It was promoted to Group 2 status in 1983.

The race was renamed the Prix Guillaume d'Ornano in 1987. It was named in memory of Guillaume d'Ornano (1894–1985), a former owner of Haras de Manneville, a stud farm near Deauville.

Records
Leading jockey (5 wins):
 Frankie Dettori – Kabool (1998), Best of the Bests (2000), Masterful (2001), Sri Putra (2009).Mishriff (2020)

Leading trainer (11 wins):
 André Fabre – Al Nasr (1981), Mourjane (1983), Creator (1989), Antisaar (1990), Dernier Empereur (1993), Lassigny (1994, dead-heat), Val Royal (1999), Russian Cross (2008), Saint Baudolino (2012), Vancouverite (2013), New Bay (2015)

Leading owner (6 wins):
 Guy de Rothschild – Marly Knowe (1953), Tropique (1955), Tang (1962), Chutney (1963), La Bamba (1964), Pinson (2005)

Winners since 1979

Earlier winners

 1952:
 1953: Marly Knowe
 1954: Tribord
 1955: Tropique
 1956:
 1957: Fil d'Argent
 1958: Wallaby
 1959: Fatralo
 1960: Hautain
 1961: Tiffauges
 1962: Tang
 1963: Chutney
 1964: La Bamba
 1965: Rayon Rose
 1966: Top Dream
 1967: Topyo
 1968: Semillant
 1969: Gag
 1970: Gold Rod
 1971: Galant Prince
 1972: La Troublerie
 1973:
 1974: Twig
 1975: Kasteel
 1976: Iron Duke
 1977: Gairloch
 1978: Crimson Beau

See also
 List of French flat horse races
 Recurring sporting events established in 1952  – this race is included under its original title, Prix de la Côte Normande.

References

 France Galop / Racing Post:

 france-galop.com – A Brief History: Prix Guillaume d'Ornano.
 galop.courses-france.com – Prix Guillaume d'Ornano – Palmarès depuis 1983.
 galopp-sieger.de – Prix Guillaume d'Ornano (ex Prix Côte de la Normande).
 horseracingintfed.com – International Federation of Horseracing Authorities – Prix Guillaume d'Ornano (2017).

Flat horse races for three-year-olds
Deauville-La Touques Racecourse
Horse races in France